Vincenzo Giustiniani (died 1614) was a Roman Catholic prelate who served as Bishop of Gravina di Puglia (1593–1614).

Biography
Vincenzo Giustiniani was born in Chios, Greece in 1550.
On 2 August 1593, he was appointed during the papacy of Pope Clement VIII as Bishop of Gravina di Puglia. 
On 29 Aug 1593, he was consecrated bishop by Alfonso Gesualdo di Conza, Cardinal-Bishop of Ostia e Velletri, with Melchiorre Pelletta, Titular Bishop of Chrysopolis in Arabia, and Cristóbal Robuster y Senmanat, Bishop of Orihuela, serving as co-consecrators. 
He served as Bishop of Gravina di Puglia until his death in 1614.

While bishop, he was the principal co-consecrator of Marco Giustiniani, Bishop of Chios (1604).

References

External links and additional sources
 (for Chronology of Bishops) 
 (for Chronology of Bishops) 

17th-century Italian Roman Catholic bishops
Bishops appointed by Pope Clement VIII
1550 births
1614 deaths